George Aldwyn Methuen Isherwood (1889-1974) was a rugby union international who was part of the first official British and Irish Lions team that toured South Africa in 1910.

Early life
George Aldwyn Methuen Isherwood was born on 3 February 1889 in Barton upon Irwell, Lancashire, England. He was the son of the stone and builder's merchant, Samuel G Isherwood and Annie Methuen (daughter of Scottish chemist Richard Methuen). He also had a younger sister Dorothy. For a time he lived on the Isle of Man whilst boarding at Ramsey Grammar School, but went on to attend Dulwich College in south London where he played both rugby and cricket for the school.

Rugby career
Isherwood went on to play for Cheshire and played regularly for that county side in the 1909 season. Isherwood also played for Sale and was part of the 50th anniversary team that swept to an unprecedented season record of P 26, W 24, D 2. Although P.H. Davies is counted as Sale's first international (having been picked to play for England in 1927), it was Isherwood who was Sale's first representative in an international Test match, when he played in all three tests of the 1910 British tour to South Africa at scrum-half. Isherwood was selected for this first official tour (in that it was sanctioned and selected by the four Home Nations official governing bodies) and took part in twenty out of the twenty four matches played, including all three ‘Tests'. He was said to have played a useful and consistent game at half. Despite playing for the British team, he was never selected for England.

First World War
Isherwood fought in the Royal Field Artillery in the first world war, rising to the rank of captain. Amongst the theatres of wars in which he served were Egypt, in September 1914 and in Gallipoli in May 1915.

References

1889 births
1974 deaths
English rugby union players
Rugby union scrum-halves
Sale Sharks players
British & Irish Lions rugby union players from England
People educated at Dulwich College
English people of Scottish descent
Rugby union players from Greater Manchester
British Army personnel of World War I
Royal Field Artillery officers